Insane is the third album by the Swedish heavy metal band Syron Vanes, released in 2003. It was produced by Anders Hahne.

Recording 
The album was recorded in Anders Hahne's Smallhouse Studios studio in 2003. This was the album that would mark Syron Vanes comeback. All the songs were mixed and mastered in February 2003. The final release medium was on CD.

Story 
Musically this album has a more modern approach than the albums from the 1980s. The band decided that there shouldn't be any guitar solos on the songs, although "Black World" and "Keep me Up" do have solos.
A video was made of the song Insane

Track listing

Personnel 
Syron Vanes
 Rimbert Vahlstroem – guitar, lead vocals
 Anders Hahne – guitar
 Staffan Lindstedt – drums
 Jakob Lagergren – bass

Production
 Produced by Anders Hahne
 Mixing Engineer Anders Hahne
 Recording Engineer Anders Hahne
 Mastering Engineer Thomas Eberger at Cutting Room Stockholm
 Sleeve artwork by Anders Ohlin and Valentine Pecovnik
 Photography by Anders Ohlin
 Published by Carnival Records

References

External links 
 Official Syron Vanes website

Syron Vanes albums
2003 albums